De Alwis is a Sinhalese surname derived from the Portuguese surname Alves.

Notable people
 Albert L. De Alwis Seneviratne, Ceylonese politician
 Amali de Alwis (born 1980), British executive
 Anandatissa de Alwis (1919–1996), Sri Lankan politician
 Anuk de Alwis (born 1991), Sri Lankan cricketer
 Ashanthi De Alwis, Sri Lankan musician
 Charles Alwis Hewavitharana, Sri Lankan Sinhala independence activist and physician
 Guy de Alwis (1959–2013), Sri Lankan cricketer
 James De Alwis (1823–1878), Ceylonese politician
 Lakshman de Alwis (1940–2008), Sri Lankan athlete
 Lanka de Alwis, Sri Lankan cricketer
 Malathi de Alwis, Sri Lankan anthropologist
 Neal de Alwis (born 1914), Ceylonese politician
 Padmalal de Alwis, Sri Lankan politician
 Prasantha Lal De Alwis, Sri Lankan lawyer
 Premakeerthi de Alwis (1947–1989), Sri Lankan broadcaster
 Sacha De Alwis (born 1992), Sri Lankan cricketer
 Stanley de Alwis (1936–2019), Ceylonese cricketer
 Susantha De Alwis (died 2008), Sri Lankan diplomat
 Suwini de Alwis (born 1975), Sri Lankan cricketer
 William de Alwis (1842–1916), Ceylonese artist

See also
 

Sinhalese surnames